Fruit curd is a dessert spread and topping usually made with citrus fruit, such as lemon, lime, orange, grapefruit or tangerine. Other flavor variations include passion fruit, mango, and berries such as raspberries, cranberries or blackberries. The basic ingredients are beaten egg yolks, sugar, fruit juice, and zest, which are gently cooked together until thick and then allowed to cool, forming a soft, smooth, flavorful spread. The egg yolks are usually tempered in the cooking process to prevent their coagulation. Some recipes also include egg whites or butter.

In late 19th- and early 20th-century England, homemade lemon curd was traditionally served with bread or scones at afternoon tea as an alternative to jam, and as a filling for cakes, small pastries, and tarts. Homemade lemon curd was usually made in relatively small amounts as it did not keep as well as jam. In more modern times, larger quantities became possible because of the use of refrigeration. Commercially manufactured curds often contain additional preservatives and thickening agents.

Contemporary commercially made curds remain a popular spread for bread, scones, toast, waffles, crumpets, pancakes, cheesecake, or muffins. They can also be used as a flavoring for desserts or yoghurt. Lemon-meringue pie, made with lemon curd and topped with meringue, has been a popular dessert in Britain, Canada, Australia and the United States since the nineteenth century. Lemon curd can also have whipped cream folded into it for such uses as filling cream puffs.

Curds differ from pie fillings or custards in that they contain a higher proportion of juice and zest, which gives them a bolder, fruitier taste. Also, curds containing butter have a smoother and creamier texture than both pie fillings and custards, which contain little or no butter and use cornstarch or flour for thickening. Additionally, unlike custards, curds are not usually eaten on their own.

Gallery

See also

 List of dessert sauces
 List of lemon dishes and drinks
 List of spreads

References

Citrus dishes
Dessert sauces
Fruit dishes
Jams and jellies
Spreads (food)